Professor Laurent Lantieri, M.D. is a French plastic surgeon who is a pioneer in the field of face transplantation. He performed the first second and third full face transplants. He was the first person to do a second face transplant on the same patient in 2018.

References

Living people
Year of birth missing (living people)
French surgeons